Latvia participated in the 2010 Summer Youth Olympics in Singapore.

Medalists

Athletics

Boys

Cycling

Cross Country

Time Trial

BMX

Road Race

Overall

 * Received -5 for finishing road race with all three racers

Modern pentathlon

Rowing

Girls

Sailing

Windsurfing

Swimming

Boys

Girls

Weightlifting

Boys

References

External links
Competitors List: Latvia

2010 in Latvian sport
Nations at the 2010 Summer Youth Olympics
Latvia at the Youth Olympics